Antoine Blatin (1769-1846) was a French politician. He served as the mayor of Clermont-Ferrand from 1822 to 1830.

References

1769 births
1846 deaths
Mayors of Clermont-Ferrand
Chevaliers of the Légion d'honneur